HSwMS Sjölejonet was the lead ship of a class of nine naval submarines in the service of the Swedish Navy from just before World War II into the early Cold War. The submarines were ordered in response to the rising German threat to the south in the interwar period.  Sjölejonet remained in service until 1959 and was sold for scrap in 1962.

Background and description
After 1930 the rise of the German threat to the south produced more investment in Sweden's military. The Swedish Navy was given more funds and new submarine designs were ordered. Sjölejonet was the  lead ship of her class of submariness. This gave the submarine a maximum speed of  surfaced and  submerged. The submarine had a crew of 38. Sjölejonet was armed with six  torpedo tubes, three of which were situated in the bow, one in the stern and the remaining two in a single traversing deck mounting. For anti-aircraft defence, the submarines had two  guns in disappearing mounts. 

In the 1950s, Sjölejonet underwent a major refit where the guns and deck torpedo tubes were removed and the conning tower was streamlined. The number of crew was reduced to 32.

Construction and career
Constructed by Kockums MV A/Bat their shipyard in Malmö, Sweden, Sjölejonets keel was laid down in 1935. The submarine was launched on 25 July 1936 and was commissioned on 21 August 1938. The submarine remained in service until stricken on 15 May 1959. The vessel was sold for scrap in 1962.

Notes

Citations

References
 
 
  

Sjölejonet-class submarines
Ships built in Malmö
1936 ships